The longlip jumprock (Moxostoma albidum) is a Mexican species of freshwater fish in the family Catostomidae.

References

 

Moxostoma
Taxa named by Charles Frédéric Girard
Fish described in 1856